was the governor of Akita Prefecture. A native of Ōmagari, Akita and graduate of Waseda University, he was first elected to the post in 1997 after serving as mayor of Yokote, Akita since 1991.

He ran in House of Councillors election in 2010 as a proportional candidate of Your Party, received 45,846 votes nationwide and won a seat ranking 4th on his party list.

References

External links 
Official page 

1940 births
Living people
Waseda University alumni
Mayors of places in Japan
Governors of Akita Prefecture
Members of the House of Councillors (Japan)
Your Party politicians
21st-century Japanese politicians
Unity Party (Japan) politicians